Sacred Heart is an album by Peter Ostroushko, released in 2000. It is the final part of the trilogy Ostroushko calls his "heartland trilogy" — Heart of the Heartland, Pilgrims on the Heart Road, and Sacred Heart. In contrast to the first two albums, Sacred Heart is completely instrumental.

Reception 

In his review for Allmusic, critic William Ruhlmann stated "Sacred Heart is always presenting different styles to the listener, even within the same piece, and each seems fully realized before giving way to the next. It's a multi-course meal that keeps surprising the palate and leaves the listener feeling satisfied but not overstuffed."

Track listing 
All songs by Peter Ostroushko.
"Boston" – 6:16
"Sacred Heart, Pts. 1 & 2" – 11:13
"Puckett's Farewell" – 4:38
"Lafayette" – 7:00
"Even the Ravens Mourn Over You" – 3:13
"Three Crows" – 3:58
"Tatiana's Lament" – 4:22
"Sloboda" – 6:58
"Medicine Bow" – 5:17
"Madison" – 4:49

Personnel
Peter Ostroushko – guitar, mandolin, fiddle
Dean Magraw – guitar
Joel Sayles – bass
Gordon Knudtson – drums
Bruce Allard – violin, viola
Marc Anderson – percussion
Jimi Englund – percussion
Dirk Freymuth – guitar
Ken Holmen – saxophone
Bruce Kurnow – harmonica
Ruth Mackenzie – voices
Mike Nelson – trombone
Steve Strand – trumpet
Diane Tremaine – cello

Production notes
Produced, arranged, conducted and mixed by Peter Ostroushko
Executive producer – Bob Feldman
Engineered and mixed by Rob Genedak
Mastered by David Glasser
Liner notes by Peter White

References

2000 albums
Peter Ostroushko albums
Red House Records albums